Tore Planke (born 25 January 1943) is a Norwegian engineer, inventor and businessperson.

He was born in Oslo to Sverre Martens Planke and Vivien Brath, and is a brother of Petter Planke. He was married to Grete Lind from 1970 to 1991, and to Ingrid Elisabeth Planke from 1994.

Planke graduated from the Norwegian Institute of Technology in 1969, specializing in cybernetics. He co-founded the industry company Tomra in 1972, along with his brother. The company produced reverse vending machines based on his inventions using electronics and optics for recognizing the bottles.

References

1943 births
Living people
Engineers from Oslo
Norwegian Institute of Technology alumni
Norwegian inventors
Norwegian company founders